Blues Around the Clock is an album by blues vocalist Jimmy Witherspoon which was recorded in 1963 and released on the Prestige label.

Reception

Scott Yanow of Allmusic states, "even if nothing all that memorable occurs, the music is enjoyable".

Track listing 
All compositions by Jimmy Witherspoon except where noted.
 "I Had a Dream" (Big Bill Broonzy) – 2:30     
 "Goin' to Chicago" (Count Basie, Jimmy Rushing) – 2:19     
 "No Rollin' Blues" – 4:45     
 "You Made Me Love You" (Joseph McCarthy, James V. Monaco) – 2:44     
 "My Babe" (Willie Dixon) – 1:48     
 "S.K. Blues" (Saunders King) – 3:51     
 "Whose Hat Is That" – 2:40     
 "Around the Clock" (Wynonie Harris) – 3:15     
 "He Gave Me Everything" – 3:02     
 "Goin' Down Slow" (James Oden) – 2:45

Personnel 
Jimmy Witherspoon – vocals
Paul Griffin – organ
Chauncey "Lord" Westbrook – guitar
Leonard Gaskin – bass
Herbie Lovelle – drums

References 

Jimmy Witherspoon albums
1964 albums
Prestige Records albums
Albums produced by Ozzie Cadena
Albums recorded at Van Gelder Studio